Chawanangwa Kawonga (born 5 January 1995) is a Malawian football midfielder who currently plays for TS Sporting.

References

1995 births
Living people
Malawian footballers
Malawi international footballers
Silver Strikers FC players
FC Chibuto players
CD Costa do Sol players
TS Sporting F.C. players
Association football midfielders
Malawian expatriate footballers
Expatriate footballers in Mozambique
Malawian expatriate sportspeople in Mozambique
Expatriate soccer players in South Africa
Malawian expatriate sportspeople in South Africa